Raymond Guilliod (born 10 November 1919 in Saint-Claude, Guadeloupe; died 1 November 2005) was a politician from Guadeloupe who served in the French National Assembly from 1973 to 1981 .

References 
 page on the French National Assembly website

1919 births
2005 deaths
People from Saint-Claude, Guadeloupe
Guadeloupean politicians
Union of Democrats for the Republic politicians
Rally for the Republic politicians
Deputies of the 5th National Assembly of the French Fifth Republic
Deputies of the 6th National Assembly of the French Fifth Republic